Marty Riessen and Margaret Court were the defending champions and successfully defended their title, defeating Frew McMillan and Judy Dalton 6–4, 6–4 in the final.

Seeds

Draw

Finals

Top half

Section 1

Section 2

Bottom half

Section 3

Section 4

References

External links
1970 US Open – Doubles draws and results at the International Tennis Federation

Mixed Doubles
US Open (tennis) by year – Mixed doubles